Balcatta Senior High School is an independent public co-educational high day school, located on Poincaire Road in Balcatta, approximately  north of Perth, Western Australia.

History
The school was established in 1967 and caters for students from Year 7 to Year 12. 

In 2003 the school won the inaugural Institute of Chartered Accountants Award in Australia’s Great Student Debate.

Catchment area
Balcatta's catchment area has been specified by the WA Department of Education to include all or parts of the following suburbs: Balcatta, Gwelup, Nollamara, Stirling and Westminster. Some areas are able to attend Carine Senior High School or the Western Suburbs Secondary Schools Cluster. Balcatta's feeder primary schools are Balcatta, Takari and West Balcatta. Lake Gwelup and Osborne primary students most feed to Balcatta but some are eligible to attend either Balcatta or Mirrabooka Senior High School.

Notable alumni 
 Johnny Ruffoa singer-songwriter and dancer; contestant in the third Australian season of The X Factor; participated in the Australian 2012 season of Dancing with the Stars
 Shaun Tananimator; 2011 Academy Award winner for The Lost Thing

See also

List of schools in the Perth metropolitan area

References

External links
 Balcatta Senior High School

Educational institutions established in 1967
Public high schools in Perth, Western Australia
State Register of Heritage Places in the City of Stirling
1967 establishments in Australia